Kovda is a rural locality (a selo) in Kandalakshsky District of Murmansk Oblast, Russia, located beyond the Arctic Circle at a height of  above sea level. Population: 20 (2010 Census).

References

Notes

Sources

Rural localities in Murmansk Oblast
Kandalakshsky District
Kemsky Uyezd